This is a demography of the population of Dominica including population density, ethnicity, religious affiliations and other aspects of the population.

Population
According to the preliminary 2011 census results Dominica has a population of 71,293. The population growth rate is very low, due primarily to emigration to more prosperous Caribbean Islands, the United Kingdom, the United States, Canada, and Australia.

Population by parishes

Vital statistics

Structure of the population
Structure of the population (31.12.2006) (Estimates) :

Ethnic groups
The vast majority of Dominicans are of African descent (75% at the 2014 census). There is a significant mixed population (19%)  at the 2014 census due to intermarriage, along with a small European origin minority (0.8%; descendants of French, British, and Irish colonists), East Indians (0.1%) groups, and there are small numbers of Lebanese/Syrians (0.1%) and Asians.

Amerindians
Dominica is the only Eastern Caribbean island that still has a population of pre-Columbian native Caribs (also known as Kalinago), who were exterminated, driven from neighbouring islands, or mixed with Africans and/or Europeans. According to the 2001 census there are only 2,001 Caribs remaining (2.9% of the total population). A considerable growth occurred since the 1991 census when 1,634 Caribs were counted (2.4% of the total population). 
The Caribs live in eight villages on the east coast of Dominica. This special Carib Territory was granted by the British Crown in 1903.
The present number of Kalinago is estimated at 4% more than 3,000.

Other demographic statistics
Demographic statistics according to the CIA World Factbook, unless otherwise indicated.

Nationality
noun: Dominican(s)
adjective: Dominican

Population
74,027 (July 2018 est.)

Ethnic groups
African descent 86.6%, mixed 9.1%, indigenous 2.9%, other 1.3%, unspecified 0.2% (2001 est.)

People - note: 3,000-3,500 Kalinago (Carib) still living on Dominica are the only pre-Columbian population remaining in the Caribbean; only 70-100 may be "pure" Kalinago because of years of integration into the broader population

Age structure

0-14 years: 21.62% (male 8,187 /female 7,815)
15-24 years: 14.37% (male 5,473 /female 5,167)
25-54 years: 42.59% (male 15,985 /female 15,541)
55-64 years: 9.99% (male 3,927 /female 3,470)
65 years and over: 11.43% (male 3,814 /female 4,648) (2018 est.)

Median age
total: 34 years. Country comparison to the world: 88th
male: 33.5 years 
female: 34.5 years (2018 est.)

Birth rate
15 births/1,000 population (2018 est.) Country comparison to the world: 125th

Death rate
7.9 deaths/1,000 population (2018 est.) Country comparison to the world: 92nd

Total fertility rate
2.03 children born/woman (2018 est.) Country comparison to the world: 114th

Net migration rate
-5.4 migrant(s)/1,000 population (2018 est.) Country comparison to the world: 196th

Population growth rate
0.17% (2018 est.) Country comparison to the world: 182nd

Languages
English (official), French patois

Religions
Roman Catholic 61.4%, Protestant 28.6% (includes Evangelical 6.7%, Seventh Day Adventist 6.1%, Pentecostal 5.6%, Baptist 4.1%, Methodist 3.7%, Church of God 1.2%, other 1.2%), Rastafarian 1.3%, Jehovah's Witness 1.2%, other 0.3%, none 6.1%, unspecified 1.1% (2001 est.)

Life expectancy at birth
total population: 77.4 years 
male: 74.4 years 
female: 80.5 years (2018 est.)

Urbanization
urban population: 70.5% of total population (2018)
rate of urbanization: 0.94% annual rate of change (2015-20 est.)

Obesity - adult prevalence rate
27.9% (2016) Country comparison to the world: 33rd

Languages
English is the official language and universally understood; however, because of historic French domination, Antillean Creole, a French-lexified creole language, is also widely spoken.

Religion

According to the 2001 census, 91.2% percent of the population of Dominica is considered Christian, 1.6% has a non-Christian religion and 6.1% has no religion or did not state a religion (1.1%).

Roughly 58% of Christians are Roman Catholics, a reflection of early French influence on the island, and one third are Protestant. The Evangelicals constitute the largest Protestant group, with 6.7% of the population. Seventh-day Adventists are the second largest group (6.1%). The next largest group are Pentecostals (5.6% of the population), followed by Baptists (4.1%).  Other Christians include Methodists (3.7%), Church of God (1.2%), Jehovah's Witnesses (1.2%), Anglicanism (0.6%) and Brethren Christian (0.3%).
During the past decades the number of Roman Catholics and Anglicans has decreased, while the number of other Protestants has increased, especially Evangelicals, Seventh-day Adventists, Pentecostals (5.6% of the population) and Baptists).

The number of non-Christians is small. These religious groups include the Rastafarian Movement (1.3% of the population), Hinduism (0.1%) and Muslims (0.2%).

References

 
Society of Dominica